Benedicto Bravo (8 May 1962 – 24 December 2020) was a Mexican professional footballer who played as a defender or midfielder.

Career
Bravo played for Unión de Curtidores and Club León. He later worked for Club León as a coach and technical director.

He died at age 58 from COVID-19, during the pandemic in Mexico.

References

1960s births
2020 deaths
Mexican footballers
Association football defenders
Association football midfieldders
Unión de Curtidores footballers
Club León footballers
Club León non-playing staff
Deaths from the COVID-19 pandemic in Mexico